"Emotion Sickness" is a song by the Australian alternative rock band Silverchair. It was released as the first song on their 1999 album Neon Ballroom. At 6 minutes long, it is the band's third longest song. Australian pianist David Helfgott makes a guest appearance on the song, along with the Sydney Symphony Orchestra. In a 1999 interview with Metal Hammer, Daniel Johns said that "Emotion Sickness" is his favorite Silverchair song.

Although the song is not typical of Silverchair's work, "Emotion Sickness" is a fan favorite.

Background
For "Emotion Sickness", the band's frontman, Daniel Johns wanted "a really manic and broken piano part to break up the album". The band's management had the idea to call Australian pianist David Helfgott, who also shared the same lawyer with Silverchair, and the band agreed without hesitation. "Daniel wanted a manic piano part. It suited the song. He wanted it so it wasn't typical - didn't want something that was nice and kinda polished. He wanted something that was manic and off-chords. David Helfgott was the perfect man for the job", bassist Chris Joannou said. The Sydney Symphony Orchestra is also featured in the song.

Daniel Johns said about the song:
It's about fighting against the need to get some kind of medication and trying to pretend that you've got a normal state of mind when you know for a fact that you haven't."

Music video
The music video was directed by Cate Anderson, who also directed the video for "Ana's Song". It features Australian actor Dai Paterson.

Reception
Neva Chonin of Rolling Stone called the song "mopey" and said that when the song's last words are "lessons learned," "it’s hard to suppress a sigh at the overt lyrical reference to Kurt Cobain's 'Dumb'". Chonin also called the orchestration lavish.

Covers
The song was covered by the rock band Storm the Sky (also from Australia) on the 2017 Silverchair cover album Spawn (Again).

Personnel 
 Daniel Johns – vocals, guitar
 Ben Gillies – drums
 Chris Joannou – bass
Additional personnel
 David Helfgott – piano
 Larry Muhoberac – piano arrangement
 Sydney Symphony Orchestra – strings

References

External links

1999 songs
Silverchair songs
Songs written by Daniel Johns
Songs about depression
Song recordings produced by Nick Launay
1999 singles